Pangio malayana is a species of ray-finned fish in the genus Pangio. It is found in rivers in Malaysia and Indonesia.

Footnotes 
 

Pangio
Fish described in 1956